Medan Tuanku Monorail station is a Malaysian elevated monorail train station that serves as a part of the Kuala Lumpur Monorail (KL Monorail), located in Kuala Lumpur and opened alongside the rest of the train service on August 31, 2003. This station was formerly called Wawasan Monorail station, since the adjacent development project was named as “Bandar Wawasan” in Kampung Baru area.

The station is situated above Jalan Sultan Ismail, just south of Chow Kit and located east of an intersection with Jalan Tuanku Abdul Rahman; it marks the start and end of the Monorail line that runs parallel along Sultan Ismail Road, until the Bukit Bintang station, after which the line turns west to Jalan Imbi at both road intersection.

The station is situated in and named after Medan Tuanku, a small district connected to Jalan Tuanku Abdul Rahman, Jalan Sultan Ismail and Jalan Dang Wangi via backroads.

Interchange

The station is linked to the  Sultan Ismail LRT station, 580 metres away, by a pedestrian bridge.  Dang Wangi station is also a 520-meter walk away, via Jalan Raja Abdullah. The station is also linked with the Quill City Mall via entrance E. There is no bus service provided to the station.

References

Kuala Lumpur Monorail stations
Railway stations opened in 2003